Yeti is a strategy, design and application development firm based in San Francisco, California. It was founded in 2010 by Tony Scherba & Rudy Mutter.

Beginnings and early history
Yeti was founded by Anthony “Tony” Scherba and Rudy Mutter in 2010.Co-founders met while attending Northeastern University, where they both double majored in computer science and business. Scherba and Mutter used to develop websites since they were teenagers, so by the end of their undergraduate studies, they decided to start their own company. A week after their graduation, they got their first client.

Present day
Yeti is located in a SOMA warehouse converted into a software invention workshop. The company has worked with large tech firms in the San Francisco Bay Area and Silicon Valley and has innovated software and hardware products.

It is active in the San Francisco development community and is known for organizing San Francisco Django meet-ups and providing free courses on Django, a framework for web applications.

Development process 
Yeti builds clients’ app ideas via product design, research and development, and a business-minded delivery analysis. Yeti's work on product design entails workshops, user testing, branding, roadmaps and web/app design. The research and development phase may consist of rapid prototyping, iOS and android testing, robotics, Bluetooth and virtual reality applications. Yeti creates custom delivery for clients utilizing open sourcing, Agile development, beta testing, launch support and scaling.

References

External links
Yeti.co
Rudy Mutter on the Internet of Things on Yeti’s Blog.
Django Meetup
Odyssey Analytics as data consultant.

Companies based in San Francisco